The 1997–98 season was the third in the history of Canberra Cosmos. It was also the third season in the National Soccer League.

Players

Competitions

Overview

National Soccer League

League table

Results by round

Matches

Statistics

Appearances and goals
Players with no appearances not included in the list.

Clean sheets

References

Canberra Cosmos FC seasons